Krka is a settlement in the Municipality of Ivančna Gorica in central Slovenia. It lies near the source of the Krka River, from which it gets its name. The area is part of the historical region of Lower Carniola. The municipality is now included in the Central Slovenia Statistical Region.

History
The settlement of Krka was created in 1953, when the former villages of Videm and Gmajna were merged into a single settlement.

Church

The local parish church is dedicated to Saints Cosmas and Damian and belongs to the Roman Catholic Diocese of Novo Mesto. It dates to the 12th century with numerous alterations over the centuries.

References

External links

Krka on Geopedia

Populated places in the Municipality of Ivančna Gorica